Kołonice  (Kolonychi) is a village in the administrative district of Gmina Baligród, within Lesko County, Subcarpathian Voivodeship, in south-eastern Poland.

The closest public airport is Uzhhorod International Airport in Ukraine, approximately 72km, or 45 miles away from Kolonice.

References

Villages in Lesko County